Deborah Anzinger (born in 1978) is a Jamaican artist who creates painting, sculpture, video and sound to "interrogate and reconfigure aesthetic syntax that relate us to land and gendered and raced bodies". Anzinger works as an artist has been featured in several exhibitions, galleries and museums which include the Pérez Art Museum Miami and the Institute of Contemporary Art, Philadelphia.

Early life and career 
Anzinger was born in St. Andrew Parish, Jamaica in 1978. She received a BS from Washington College in 2001, and a PhD in Immunology and Microbiology from Rush University Medical Center in Chicago.

Career
She is the founder of New Local Space (NLS) in Kingston, Jamaica. Anzinger's writing has been published in Caribbean Quarterly.

Exhibitions 
 New Roots: 10 Emerging Artists, July 28–September 30, 2013, National Gallery of Jamaica
Field Notes: Extracts, June 18, 2015 – September 27, 2015, Museum of Contemporary African Diasporan Arts
 Double Dutch: Heino Schmid + Deborah Anzinger, September 22–October 30, 2016, National Art Gallery of The Bahamas
An Unlikely Birth, April 26–August 11, 2019, Institute of Contemporary Art, Philadelphia
 The Other Side of Now: Foresight in Contemporary Caribbean Art, July 18, 2019 – June 7, 2020, Pérez Art Museum Miami
 Resisting Paradise, September 19–December 8, 2019, Fonderie Darling, Montréal (Canada)

Awards and grants 
 2016 fellowship to Skowhegan School of Painting and Sculpture
 2018 Pollock-Krasner Foundation Grant
 2020 Soros Arts Fellow

Bibliography

References

External links

Further reading 
 https://caricuk.co.uk/wp-content/uploads/2021/04/CaribbeanInsecurities_ExhibitCatalogue2021.pdf
https://doi.org/10.1215/07990537-3844307
 https://bombmagazine.org/articles/labor-and-nature-deborah-anzinger-interviewed/
https://www.centerforexperimentalethnography.org/events/memorializing-otherwise
http://marshapearce.com/qanda/learning-the-hard-lessons/

1978 births
21st-century Jamaican painters
Rush University alumni
Washington College alumni
Jamaican sculptors
Living people
Skowhegan School of Painting and Sculpture alumni